Hawthorne is a suburb of the City of Brisbane, Queensland, Australia.

Geography

Toponymy
There are two theories about the name of the suburb. One is that butcher William Baynes purchased land in the area in 1875 and named the area after Hawthorn in Melbourne where he lived before his arrival in Queensland in 1859. An alternative theory is that Baynes planted many hawthorne bushes in the 1850s and 1860s.

History
Hawthorne started as a farming district in the 1860s, and was gradually subdivided as Brisbane grew. This was helped by the introduction of ferry and tram services.

In February 1885, the "Hawthorne Estate" was advertised for sale by Arthur Martin & Co.  The reverse of the advertisement included a sketch of the Hawthorne Estate from across the river.

In October 1885 the "Galloway's Hill Estate" was advertised to be auctioned by Arthur Martin & Co. A map shows the blocks, including river front land, in Wendell Street, Waldo Street, and adjoining land in Hawthorne Road.

The "Oak Park Estate", made up of blocks on Orchard Street, Park Street and Oak Street, was first advertised for sale in September 1885. A map advertising 33 allotments in the estate to be auctioned on 13 August 1887 shows the auctioneer was G.T. Bell & Co. Due to inclement weather that sale was postponed to 20 August 1887.

The "Bulimba Road Estate", made up of 200 blocks near the Hawthorne Estate, was advertised for sale in June 1887. A map advertising the estate shows the blocks near Bulimba Road (now Hawthorne Road) for auction by Arthur Martin & Co.

The "Bulimba Park Estate", comprising 78 allotments in the area that is now Mullens Street, Barton Road and adjoining lots on Hawthorne Road and Riding Road, was advertised for sale in November 1887. A map of the estate notes the seller of the land as the Metropolitan Freehold Land & Building Company Limited, and the auctioneer as G.T. Bell.

In November 1888 the "Circular Quay Estate", made up of 40 allotments, including six riverfront blocks, within five minutes' walk to the Bulimba steam ferry, was advertised to be auctioned by John Macnamara & Co. A map shows the lots in the area of land currently bordered by Leura Avenue.

On 14 November 1914, a Church of Church was erected in a day. A Bible school had been previously established in 1912 by Mr R. Halgh, using a hall near the Hawthorne ferry wharf. In 1970, the building was raised and renovated with the addition of a ground hall for use as a hall.

Lourdes Hill College was established in February 1916 by the Sisters of the Good Samaritan. It was officially dedicated on Sunday 7 May 1916 by Roman Catholic Archbishop of Brisbane, James Duhig.

In September 1935 "Barton Lodge Estate" , comprising six blocks on Barton Road and Gordon Street, were advertised to be auctioned by Cameron Bros. A map advertising the auction shows three of the blocks with river frontage and all within walking distance of the Hawthorne ferry and the Balmoral tram terminus.

The 2011 Census recorded 4,775 residents in Hawthorne, of whom 50.5% were female and 49.5% were male. The median age of the population was 33; four years younger than the Australian median. 71.3% of people living in Hawthorne were born in Australia, compared to the national average of 69.8%. The other most common countries of birth were England (5.1%), New Zealand (3.9%), Scotland (0.9%), the United States (0.9%), and South Africa (0.8%). 88% of people only spoke English at home, while the next most commonly spoken languages were Spanish (0.8%), Greek (0.7%), French (0.6%), Japanese (0.4%), and Italian (0.4%).

Education 
Lourdes Hill College is a Catholic secondary (7-12) school for girls at 86 Hawthorne Road. In 2017, the school had an enrolment of 1,234 students with 87 teachers (86 full-time equivalent) and 69 non-teaching staff (57 full-time equivalent).

Landmarks
The Hawthorne Cinema complex, on Hawthorne Road, is a classic theatre, opened in the 1940s it contains a large curved screen - one of the largest in Brisbane, as well as 2 smaller screens. 
It is part of the Cineplex Australia chain of cinemas, also including the Balmoral, Southbank and the (newly opened) Victoria Point cinema complexes. Hawthorne is home to several parks, and has numerous public transport options and a CityCat stop.  Lourdes Hill College is an independent girls college in the heart of Hawthorne, that opened in 1916.

Heritage listings 
Hawthorne has a number of heritage-listed sites, including:

 35 Amy Street: House
 62 Balmoral Street: Brethrens Meeting Room
 142 Barton Road: House
 156 Barton Road: Airdrie
 28 Gordon Street: Hawthorne Ferry Terminal & Hardcastle Park
 46 Hawthorne Road: Halcyon
 86 Hawthorne Road: Lourdes Hill College
 159 Hawthorne Road: former Hawthorne Presbyterian Church
 25 Virginia Avenue: House

Transport
Hawthorne is well serviced by public transport with Bus, CityCat and close proximity to Morningside railway station. Hawthorne is located in zone 2 of the TransLink integrated public transport system.

Train

Bus
Hawthorne is serviced by two bus routes, the 230 and the 232. Each bus route provides access to the Brisbane CBD, Fortitude Valley as well as other suburbs listed below.

Bus Routes:
230 - Bulimba, Riding Rd, Gabba, South Brisbane, City, Valley
232 - Cannon Hill, Balmoral, Bulimba, East Bris, Valley, City

Ferry
The Hawthorne ferry wharf provides CityCat services to Brisbane CBD, South Bank Parklands, and other suburbs on the CityCat network.

References

Further reading

External links

 
 Bulimba and Hawthorne - Visit Brisbane
Bulimba & Hawthorne urban village

Suburbs of the City of Brisbane